Vinita Mahesh (also credited as Vinita Joshi Thakkar) is an Indian television actress. She is best known for portraying the role of Yamini Singh on Indian soap opera Bhatak Lena Baware that aired on Life OK, as Rajkumari Maan Kawar in Bharat Ka Veer Putra – Maharana Pratap and as protagonist Mohi on StarPlus's Mohi.

Career
Thakkar's first show was Navya..Naye Dhadkan Naye Sawaal, in which she played Navya's best friend Ritika Joshi. She landed her second role in Saraswatichandra and portrayed the cousin sister of Kumud, Kumari. She played a lead role as Yamini Singh in Bhatak Lena Baware after which she has starred as the lead in Mohi.

Personal life 
Vinita was married to her college friend, Tejas Thakkar from the age of 20 to 22 but the couple filed for divorce due to compatibility issues. She dated and later married Shashank Kunwar in a small, private ceremony in Mumbai.

Television

References 

Living people
Year of birth missing (living people)
Indian television actresses
Indian soap opera actresses
21st-century Indian actresses